Calumma nasutum, the Madagascar pimple-nose chameleon, is a small species of chameleon found in Madagascar. The taxonomic identity of the species is currently uncertain and in need of revision, and this revision is likely to result in several newly described species. Several different data sets indicate that C. nasutum is a complex of several species.

Taxonomy
Calumma nasutum belongs to the so-called "C. nasutum species group" within the genus Calumma. This group is a phenetic one, and has been reconstructed by some studies as being polyphyletic, but the species are unified by their small size and possession of a soft dermal appendage at the front of the nose ("rostral appendage"). The group currently consists of C. nasutum, C. fallax, C. gallus, C. vohibola, C. vatosoa, C. radamanus, C. peyrierasi, C. boettgeri, and C. linotum.

Calumma nasutum itself is a member of a species complex. Gehring et al. showed that there were numerous genetic lineages in the Calumma nasutum group, which they divided into 33 Operational Taxonomic Units (OTUs). It was not clear which of these OTUs belongs to the 'real' C. nasutum, or the differences between it and C. fallax, which is morphologically similar.

References

nasutum
Endemic fauna of Madagascar
Reptiles of Madagascar
Reptiles described in 1836
Taxa named by André Marie Constant Duméril
Taxa named by Gabriel Bibron